Hoseynabad-e Tappeh Sari (also Romanized as Ḩoseynābād-e Tappeh Sarī; also known as Ḩoseynābād-e Tappehsar) is a village in Fenderesk-e Jonubi Rural District, Fenderesk District, Ramian County, Golestan Province, Iran. At the 2006 census, its population was 530, in 123 families.

References 

Populated places in Ramian County